The 2002 United States House of Representatives elections were held on November 5, 2002, in the middle of President George W. Bush's first term, to elect U.S. Representatives to serve in the 108th United States Congress. This was the first congressional election using districts drawn up during the 2000 United States redistricting cycle on the basis of the 2000 Census.

Although it was a midterm election under a Republican president, the Republican Party gained a net eight seats, solidifying their majority. This was one of three midterm elections in which the party of the incumbent president did not lose seats either in the House or in the Senate (the other such mid-term elections were in 1934 and 1998). It was the sixth midterm election in which the President's party increased its number of seats in the House, after 1814, 1822, 1902, 1934, and 1998. Some speculate that this may have been due to increased support for the President's party in the wake of the September 11 attacks.

This is the only midterm election since 1978 which left the president's party in control of the House.

Results

Federal

Summary of the November 5, 2002 United States House of Representatives election results

Source: Election Statistics - Office of the Clerk

Maps

Retirements 
In the November general elections, thirty-five incumbents did not seek re-election, either to retire or to seek other positions.

Democrats 
Thirteen Democrats did not seek re-election.
 : Carrie Meek retired.
 : Rod Blagojevich retired to run successfully for Governor of Illinois.
 : Tim Roemer retired when redistricted from the 3rd district.
 : John Baldacci retired to run successfully for Governor of Maine.
 : James A. Barcia retired to run successfully for Michigan Senate.
 : David Bonior retired to run for Governor of Michigan.
 : John J. LaFalce retired when redistricted from the 29th district.
 : Eva Clayton retired.
 : Robert A. Borski Jr. retired when redistricted from the 3rd district.
 : William J. Coyne retired.
 : Bob Clement retired to run for U.S. Senator.
 : Ken Bentsen Jr. retired to run for U.S. Senator.
 : Tom Barrett retired to run for Governor of Wisconsin.

Republicans 
Twenty-two Republicans did not seek re-election.
 : Sonny Callahan retired.
 : Bob Riley retired to run successfully for Governor of Alabama.
 : Bob Stump retired when redistricted from the 3rd district.
 : Steve Horn retired when redistricted from the 38th district.
 : Bob Schaffer retired.
 : Dan Miller retired.
 : Saxby Chambliss retired to run successfully for U.S. Senator.
 : Greg Ganske retired to run for U.S. Senator.
 : John Cooksey retired to run for U.S. Senator.
 : Bob Ehrlich retired to run successfully for Governor of Maryland.
 : John E. Sununu retired to run successfully for U.S. Senator.
 : Marge Roukema retired.
 : Joe Skeen retired.
 : Benjamin Gilman retired when redistricted from the 20th district.
 : Wes Watkins retired.
 : J. C. Watts retired.
 : Lindsey Graham retired to run successfully for U.S. Senator.
 : John Thune retired to run for U.S. Senator.
 : Van Hilleary retired to run for Governor of Tennessee.
 : Ed Bryant retired to run for U.S. Senator.
 : Dick Armey retired.
 : James V. Hansen retired.

Resignation and expulsion 
Two seats opened early due to a resignation and an expulsion. Neither were filled until the November elections.

Democrats 
One Democrat resigned and one was expelled.
 : Tony P. Hall resigned September 9, 2002 to become U.S. Ambassador to the Food and Agriculture Organization.
 : Jim Traficant was expelled July 24, 2002 for criminal conviction.

Republicans 
No Republicans resigned.

Incumbents defeated

In primary elections

Democrats 
Six Democrats lost renomination.
 : Earl Hilliard lost renomination to Artur Davis, who then won the general election.
 : Gary Condit lost renomination to Dennis Cardoza, who then won the general election.
 : Cynthia McKinney lost renomination to Denise Majette, who then won the general election.
 : Lynn N. Rivers lost renomination in a redistricting race to John Dingell, who then won the general election.
 : Thomas C. Sawyer lost renomination to Tim Ryan, who then won the general election.
 : Frank Mascara lost renomination in a redistricting race to John Murtha, who then won the general election.

Republicans 
Two Republicans lost renomination.
 : Bob Barr lost renomination in a redistricting race to John Linder, who then won the general election.
 : Brian D. Kerns lost renomination in a redistricting race to Steve Buyer, who then won the general election.

In the general election

Democrats 
Five Democrats lost re-election to Republicans.
 : James H. Maloney lost a redistricting race to Nancy Johnson.
 : Karen Thurman lost to Ginny Brown-Waite.
 : David D. Phelps lost a redistricting race to John Shimkus.
 : Bill Luther lost to John Kline.
 : Ronnie Shows lost a redistricting race to Chip Pickering.

Republicans 
Three Republicans lost re-election to Democrats.
 : Connie Morella lost to Chris Van Hollen.
 : Felix Grucci lost to Tim Bishop.
 : George Gekas lost a redistricting race to Tim Holden.

Open seats that changed parties

Democratic seats won by Republicans 
Three Democratic seats were won by Republicans.
 : Won by Chris Chocola.
 : Won by Candice Miller.
 : Won by Mike Turner.

Republican seats won by Democrats 
Five Republican seats were won by Democrats.
 : Won by Linda Sánchez.
 : Won by Jim Marshall.
 : Won by Rodney Alexander.
 : Won by Dutch Ruppersberger.
 : Won by Lincoln Davis.

Open seats that parties held

Democratic seats held by Democrats 
Democrats held five of their open seats.
 : Won by Kendrick Meek.
 : Won by Rahm Emanuel.
 : Won by Frank Ballance.
 : Won by Jim Cooper.
 : Won by Chris Bell.

Republican seats held by Republicans 
Republicans held fourteen of their open seats.
 : Won by Jo Bonner.
 : Won by Mike Rogers.
 : Won by Trent Franks.
 : Won by Marilyn Musgrave.
 : Won by Katherine Harris.
 : Won by Steve King.
 : Won by Jeb Bradley.
 : Won by Scott Garrett.
 : Won by Steve Pearce.
 : Won by Tom Cole.
 : Won by Gresham Barrett.
 : Won by Marsha Blackburn.
 : Won by Michael C. Burgess.
 : Won by Rob Bishop.

Newly created seats 
Of the 435 districts created in the 2000 redistricting, sixteen had no incumbent representative.

Democratic gain 
Three Democrats were elected in newly created seats.
 : Won by Raúl Grijalva.
 : Won by David Scott.
 : Won by Brad Miller.

Republican gain 
Thirteen Republicans were elected in newly created seats.
 : Won by Rick Renzi.
 : Won by Devin Nunes.
 : Won by Bob Beauprez.
 : Won by Tom Feeney.
 : Won by Mario Diaz-Balart.
 : Won by Phil Gingrey.
 : Won by Max Burns.
 : Won by Thad McCotter.
 : Won by Jon Porter.
 : Won by Jim Gerlach.
 : Won by Tim Murphy.
 : Won by Jeb Hensarling.
 : Won by John Carter.

Special elections 

Two special elections were held for members to serve the remainder of the term ending January 3, 2003.

Alabama

Alaska

Arizona 

The state gained two seats in reapportionment.

Arkansas

California 

The state gained one seat in reapportionment.

Colorado 

The state gained one seat in reapportionment.

Connecticut 

The state lost one seat in reapportionment.

Delaware

Florida 

The state gained two seats in reapportionment.

Georgia 

The state gained two seats in reapportionment.

Hawaii

Idaho

Illinois 

The state lost one seat in reapportionment.

Indiana 

The state lost one seat in reapportionment.

Iowa

Kansas

Kentucky

Louisiana

Maine

Maryland

Massachusetts

Michigan 

The state lost one seat in reapportionment.

Minnesota

Mississippi 

The state lost one seat in reapportionment.

Missouri

Montana

Nebraska

Nevada

New Hampshire

New Jersey

New Mexico

New York 

The state lost two seats in reapportionment.

North Carolina 

The state gained one seat in reapportionment.

North Dakota

Ohio 

The state lost one seat in reapportionment.

Oklahoma 

The state lost one seat in reapportionment.

Oregon

Pennsylvania 

The state lost two seats in reapportionment.

Rhode Island

South Carolina

South Dakota

Tennessee

Texas 

The state gained two seats in reapportionment.

Utah

Vermont

Virginia

Washington

West Virginia

Wisconsin 

The state lost one seat in reapportionment.

Wyoming

See also
 2002 United States elections
 2002 United States gubernatorial elections
 2002 United States Senate elections
 107th United States Congress
 108th United States Congress

Notes

References

External links
 United States Election 2002 Web Archive from the U.S. Library of Congress